Eileen Mary Coparropa Alemán (born March 31, 1981 in Panama City) is a freestyle swimmer from Panama, who won a silver and a bronze medal in the women's 50m freestyle event at the Pan American Games. Nicknamed "La Sirena de Oro" she represented her native country at three consecutive Summer Olympics, starting in 1996.

The Pan-American Games 
In 1999, when she was 17 years old, Eileen participated in the 13th Pan-American Games celebrated in Winnipeg, Canada in the 50 meter free style where she achieved a historic silver medal.  It was the first silver medal in the history of the Panamanian swimming team in these games and she registered her best personal mark up until that moment: 25.78 seconds.  The gold medal was won by the American Tammie Spats with a 25.50 second mark.

In 2003, the games were celebrated in Santo Domingo, in the Dominican Republic.  Coparropa Alemán won the bronze medal in the 50 meter free style with a time of 25.62 seconds.  She was beaten by American Kara Lynn Joyce who won gold with a time of 25.24 seconds.

Olympic Games

Athens 2004 
Coparropa competed in the 50 meter freestyle and qualified for the semifinals with a time of 25.57 seconds. Coming in equal 13th place, she did not qualify for the finals, however her time of 25.37 seconds was a new Panamanian record. It was also the closest a Panamanian swimmer had ever come to winning an olympic medal, either men's or women's.

Personal life 
Coparropa is the oldest of two daughters of Pedro Coparropa and Guadalupe Alemán de Coparropa and began her swimming career at the age of 6.

In 2004 she graduated with honors with a bachelor's degree in business administration with a specialization in marketing from Auburn University in Auburn,Alabama.  She also received a degree in logistics from the same university.

At the 1995 Pan American Games in Mar del Plata, she finished 5th in the 50-meter freestyle.

At the 1996 Summer Olympics in Atlanta, Coparropa finished 32nd in the 50-meter freestyle.

At the 1999 Pan American Games in Winnipeg, she won a silver medal in the 50-meter freestyle. She also finished 9th in the 100-meter freestyle.

At the 2000 Summer Olympics in Sydney, Coparropa finished 27th in the 50-meter freestyle, and 32nd in the 100-meter freestyle.

At the 2003 Pan American Games in Santo Domingo, she won a bronze medal in the 50-meter freestyle. She also finished 5th in the 100-meter freestyle.

At the 2004 Summer Olympics in Athens, Coparropa finished 14th in the 50-meter freestyle, and 30th in the 100-meter freestyle.

References
 Profile
 DeporMax

External links

1981 births
Living people
Sportspeople from Panama City
Panamanian female swimmers
Panamanian female freestyle swimmers
Swimmers at the 1995 Pan American Games
Swimmers at the 1996 Summer Olympics
Swimmers at the 1999 Pan American Games
Swimmers at the 2000 Summer Olympics
Swimmers at the 2003 Pan American Games
Swimmers at the 2004 Summer Olympics
Olympic swimmers of Panama
Pan American Games silver medalists for Panama
Pan American Games bronze medalists for Panama
Pan American Games medalists in swimming
Central American and Caribbean Games gold medalists for Panama
Central American and Caribbean Games medalists in swimming
Competitors at the 1998 Central American and Caribbean Games
Competitors at the 2002 Central American and Caribbean Games
Medalists at the 1999 Pan American Games
Medalists at the 2003 Pan American Games